Francisco de Castello (1556–1636) was an Italian painter of the late-Renaissance. He was born in Flanders, of Spanish parentage. He visited Rome, for the purpose of study, when quite young, during the papacy of Gregory XIII. He painted historical pictures, generally small in size, which were much sought after. He also executed some pictures for the churches at Rome. In the church of San Giacomo degli Spagnuoli is an altarpiece of the Assumption of the Virgin with Glory of Angels and Apostles  and  a Madonna & Child with Sts. Nicholas and Julian for the church of San Rocco di Ripetta. He died at Rome.

References

1556 births
1636 deaths
16th-century Italian painters
Italian male painters
17th-century Italian painters
Flemish Renaissance painters
Emigrants from the Holy Roman Empire to Italy